Chester C. Widerquist (September 23, 1895 - July 14, 1976)  was a professional American football player for the Milwaukee Badgers, Rock Island Independents, Chicago Cardinals, Detroit Wolverines and Minneapolis Red Jackets. He attended Washington & Jefferson College, and Northwestern University.

See also

 1923 College Football All-America Team

Notes

External links
 

1895 births
1976 deaths
American football tackles
Players of American football from Illinois
People from Moline, Illinois
Washington & Jefferson Presidents football players
Washington & Jefferson College alumni
Northwestern University alumni
Northwestern Wildcats football players
Chicago Cardinals players
Detroit Wolverines (NFL) players
Milwaukee Badgers players
Minneapolis Red Jackets players
Rock Island Independents players